Hirudinella ventricosa is a species of Plagiorchiida in the family Hirudinellidae.

References 

Plagiorchiida
Animals described in 1774